Fang Fenghui (born April 1951) is a former top general in the Chinese People's Liberation Army (PLA). He served as the Chief of Joint Staff and a member of the Central Military Commission. He was placed under investigation for corruption in 2017 and subsequently convicted.

Biography
Fang was born Ma Xianyang in Chidao Township, Xunyi County, Shaanxi Province. His father Ma Guoxuan was a military and government officer who died in 1960. After his mother Fang Linjiang remarried in Bin County, he renamed himself Fang Fenghui using his mother's surname.

Fang joined the PLA in February 1968, at the height of the Cultural Revolution. He served in Xinjiang in his early career. He later served as commander of the Beijing Military Region (2007–2012). and commander of Guangzhou Military Region (2003–2007). Fang achieved the rank of Major general in 1998,  Lieutenant general in July 2005 and general in July 2010. He was appointed as the Chief of Joint Staff on October 25, 2012, succeeding Chen Bingde; when the Joint Staff department was re-organized in 2016 as a new organ under the Central Military Commission, Fang continued his role as chief of the joint staff.

During the 60th anniversary of the People's Republic of China, Fang served as the commanding officer of the military contingent during the inspection parade of then Central Military Commission chairman Hu Jintao.

In August 2017, Fang was placed under investigation for corruption. He was sent to military procuratorial organs in January 2018. He was expelled from the Communist Party on October 16, 2018. On February 20, 2019, Fang was sentenced to life imprisonment for bribery.

Fang was a member of the 18th Central Committee of the Chinese Communist Party.

References

1951 births
Living people
People's Liberation Army generals from Shaanxi
People from Xianyang
PLA National Defence University alumni
Commanders of the Beijing Military Region
Expelled members of the Chinese Communist Party
People's Liberation Army generals convicted of corruption
Delegates to the 11th National People's Congress
Members of the 17th Central Committee of the Chinese Communist Party
Members of the 18th Central Committee of the Chinese Communist Party
Prisoners sentenced to life imprisonment by the People's Republic of China

mt:Fang Fenghui